The Terminal List is an American action thriller television series created by David DiGilio, based on Jack Carr's 2018 novel of the same name. The series tells the story of a Navy SEAL who seeks to avenge the murder of his family. It stars Chris Pratt (who also serves as an executive producer), Constance Wu, Taylor Kitsch, Riley Keough, Arlo Mertz, and Jeanne Tripplehorn.

The Terminal List was released on Amazon Prime Video on July 1, 2022, to mixed reviews. In February 2023, the series was renewed for a second season.

Premise
The series follows Lieutenant Commander James Reece after his platoon of Navy SEALs is ambushed while on a covert mission. Reece returns home to his family with conflicting memories of the event and questions about his culpability. As new evidence emerges, Reece discovers dark forces working against him, endangering not only his life but also the lives of those he loves.

Cast and characters

Main

 Chris Pratt as Lieutenant Commander James Reece, a US Navy SEAL with eight combat deployments, and the Commander of Alpha Platoon, SEAL Team 7, and Task Force Odin's Sword.
 Constance Wu as Katie Buranek, a seasoned war correspondent for Voltstreem News
 Taylor Kitsch as Ben Edwards, a CIA Ground Branch operative, who is a former Navy SEAL and James Reece's former teammate and BUD/S classmate.
 Riley Keough as Lauren Reece, James Reece's wife
 Arlo Mertz as Lucy Reece, James Reece's daughter
 Jeanne Tripplehorn as Lorraine Hartley, Secretary of Defense

Recurring
 Nick Chinlund as Rear Admiral Gerald Pillar, Commander of WARCOM
 Matthew Rauch as Captain Leonard Howard, Judge Advocate General of WARCOM
 LaMonica Garrett as Commander Bill Cox, Commander of SEAL Team 7
 Patrick Schwarzenegger as Special Warfare Operator Second Class Donald "Donny" Mitchell, Alpha Platoon's youngest member
 Jared Shaw as Special Warfare Operator First Class Ernest "Boozer" Vickers, a member of Alpha Platoon
 Tyner Rushing as Liz Riley, a private airline pilot and former U.S. Army Aviation Branch Warrant Officer, who was rescued in 2007 by Reece's team when her Kiowa was shot down in Iraq and was Lucy's God-Mother.
 Arturo Castro as Jordan Groff, Katie's editor at Voltstream News
 Jai Courtney as Steve Horn, CEO and President of Capstone Industries
 Paul McCrane as Dr. Mike Tedesco, CEO of Nubellum, a pharmaceutical subsidiary of Capstone Industries
 Stephen Bishop as Richard Fontana, a Department of Defense official and Hartley's underling
 J. D. Pardo as Tony Layun, an FBI special agent and head of the Fugitive Task Force for the San Diego field office
 Christina Vidal as Mackenzie 'Mac' Wilson, a deputy U.S. Marshal and Layun's partner on the Fugitive Task Force
 Drew Starkey as Junior Alba, a SDPD detective and Layun's subordinate on the Fugitive Task Force
 Alexis Louder as Nicole Deptul, an FBI special agent and Layun's subordinate on the Fugitive Task Force
 Hiram A. Murray as Jackson, a security contractor at Steve Horn's Talos Tactical

Guest
 Warren Kole as NCIS Special Agent Josh Holder
 Justin Garza as Special Warfare Operator First Class Victor Ramirez, a member of Alpha Platoon
 Tom Amandes as Vic Campbell, Lauren Reece’s father
 Catherine Dyer as Rachel Campbell, Lauren Reece’s mother
 Marco Rodríguez as Marco Del Toro, a Mexican businessman and family friend of the Reeces
 Sean Gunn as Saul Agnon, Vice President of Capstone Industries
 Carsten Norgaard as Elias Ryberg, a prospective buyer of Nubellum Pharmaceuticals
 Geoff Pierson as Senator Joe Pryor, member of Senate Appropriations Subcommittee on Defense
 Patricia de Leon as Paola Del Toro, Marco’s wife
 Renata Friedman as Anne Howard, Captain Howard's wife
 Jack Yang as Brian Buranek, Katie's brother 
 Nicole Steinwedell as Deborah Buranek, Katie's sister-in-law
 Nate Boyer as Luke Malick, FBI HRT team leader
 Remi Adeleke as Terrell "Tee" Daniels, FBI HRT operator
 Derek Phillips as FBI Senior Special Agent Stephen Ramsay
 Butch Klein as Marcus Boykin, a lawyer and Saul Agnon's associate
 Jack Carr as Adrian Gordonis (cameo), a Marine Raider veteran and security contractor at Talos Tacticals. Jack Carr is The Terminal List author and executive producer, as well as a former Navy SEAL officer.

Episodes

Production
In early April 2020, it was reported that the series, starring Chris Pratt, was in development, and seeking out a distributor. In early May 2020, it was reported that Amazon Prime Video landed the series and Amazon Studios would be joining the series as production studio and the series was in the process of assembling a writers room. Taylor Kitsch, Constance Wu, Jeanne Tripplehorn, Riley Keough, and Pratt's brother-in-law Patrick Schwarzenegger would join the cast in early 2021. In June 2021, LaMonica Garrett, Alexis Louder, Tom Amandes, J. D. Pardo, Christina Vidal Mitchell, Jared Shaw, Catherine Dyer, and Remi Adeleke joined the cast in recurring roles, while Arlo Mertz was cast as a series regular. In July 2021, Jai Courtney joined in a recurring role.

Pratt had previously portrayed a Navy SEAL in the 2012 film Zero Dark Thirty and had become friends with Navy SEAL Jared Shaw. Shaw knew Jack Carr from their time in the Navy, and shared an early copy of the book with Pratt, who had started a production company and was interested in developing his own projects. Carr said he had Pratt in mind when writing story, and that he had hoped to get Antoine Fuqua as the director. Pratt got into a bidding war for the rights, only to discover that he was bidding against Fuqua, so instead they partnered on developing the project. On February 1, 2023, Amazon Prime Video renewed the series for a second season.

Principal photography for The Terminal List began on March 9, 2021. Chris Pratt was paid $1.4 million per episode.

Release
The series premiered on July 1, 2022.

Prequel series
In February 2023, it was announced that a prequel series focusing on Ben Edwards had been ordered and set to air on Amazon Prime Video with Taylor Kitsch reprising the role.

Reception

Audience viewership 
The series was the number one show on Amazon Prime's "Top 10" list within two weeks of its premiere.

The Terminal List came in at No. 3 on the Nielsen chart with 1.1 billion minutes viewed across eight episodes.

Critical response 

On Rotten Tomatoes the series has a 39% approval rating based on reviews from 56 critics, with an average rating of 5.5/10. The website's critics consensus reads, "While Chris Pratt fully commits himself to The Terminal Lists mission, this thriller's unrelenting gruffness is no meat and all potatoes." Metacritic gave it a weighted average score of 40 out of 100 based on reviews from 25 critics, indicating "mixed or average reviews". CinemaBlend.com summarized the reviews saying critics agree the series was firmly in the "Shows For Dads" genre.

Dave Nemetz of TVLine panned the series, calling it "punishingly grim and hopelessly boneheaded." He criticized the series’s plot  and direction, writing, "the action is bloody but not exciting, and the story is bewildering but not interesting. In between, we get saccharine family scenes and a paint-by-numbers conspiracy that gets more complicated but not any more compelling." Daniel D'Addario of Variety called it "a dour, miserable sit, one that would be tough to take as a two-hour film, and has been inexplicably ‘roided up to eight hours." Dan Fienberg  of The Hollywood Reporter described the series as overcooked, taking "eight hours for a book that easily could have been adapted in two hours".

Liam Mathews of TV Guide rated series 7 out of 10, and compared it to other Amazon Prime Video series Bosch, Reacher and Jack Ryan, saying "These shows aren't chasing Emmys, they just want to entertain with a twisty plot, some thrilling action set pieces, and a mildly complex main character. They're also three of the service's most popular and successful shows. Prime Video's latest series, The Terminal List, fits that dad-friendly bill to a T. By the humble standards of the genre, The Terminal List is a smashing success."

Author Jack Carr responded to the negative critical responses, saying "The 95 percent , makes it all worth it. We didn't make it for the critics."

References

External links
 

2020s American drama television series
2022 American television series debuts
Amazon Prime Video original programming
American action television series
American military television series
American thriller television series
English-language television shows
Television series about conspiracy theories
Television series about revenge
Television series by Amazon Studios
Television series by Media Rights Capital
Television shows based on American novels
Vigilante television series
Works about the United States Navy SEALs